Sunway, or Shenwei,, is a series of computer microprocessors, developed by Jiangnan Computing Lab in Wuxi, China. It uses a reduced instruction set computer (RISC) architecture, but details are still sparse.

History 
The Sunway series microprocessors were developed mainly for the use of the military of the People's Republic of China. It is expressed on online forums that the original microarchitecture is believed to be inspired by the DEC Alpha. The SW-3 is thought especially to be based on the Alpha 21164.

Jack Dongarra states about the follow-on SW26010, the "Shenwei-64 Instruction Set (this is NOT related to the DEC Alpha instruction set)", and doesn't say it's a new instruction set from the three prior generations he names; although precise details of the instruction set are unknown.

Sunway SW-1 
 First generation, 2006
 Single-core
 900 MHz

Sunway SW-2 
 Second generation, 2008
 Dual-core
 1400 MHz
 SMIC 130 nm process
 70–100 W

Sunway SW-3, SW1600 
 Third generation, 2010
 16-core, 64-bit RISC
 975–1200 MHz
 65 nm process
 140.8 GFLOPS @ 1.1 GHz
 Max memory capacity: 16 GB
 Peak memory bandwidth: 68 GB/s
 Quad-channel 128-bit DDR3
 Four-issue superscalar
 Two integer and two floating-point execution units
 7-stage integer pipeline and 10-stage floating-point pipeline
 43-bit virtual address and 40-bit physical address
 Up to 8 TB virtual memory and 1 TB of physical memory supported
 L1 cache: 8 KB instruction cache and 8 KB data cache
 L2 cache: 96 KB
 128-bit system bus

Sunway SW26010 

 Fourth generation, 2016
 64-bit RISC processor
 Manycore architecture, with 4 CPU clusters on a chip, each comprising 64 lightweight compute CPUs with an additional management CPU, linked by a network-on-a-chip

See also
Sunway BlueLight
Sunway TaihuLight
Loongson – a family of Chinese MIPS processors
Supercomputing in China

References 

Microprocessors made in China
Science and technology in China

Supercomputing in China
32-bit microprocessors
64-bit microprocessors